Goodenia splendida is a species of flowering plant in the family Goodeniaceae and is endemic to Queensland. It is an erect perennial herb with lance-shaped leaves mostly at the base of the plant, and racemes or thyrses of blue or purple flowers.

Description

Taxonomy and naming
Goodenia splendida was first formally described in 2002 by Ailsa E. Holland and T.P. Boyle in the journal  Austrobaileya from specimens collected near Yarrowmere Station in 1983. The specific epithet (splendida) refers to the showy foliage and flowers.

Distribution and habitat
This goodenia grows in woodland and shrubland with species of Eucalyptus and Melaleuca between the White Mountains National Park and Lake Buchanan in central eastern Queensland.

Conservation status
Goodenia splendida is listed as of "least concern" under the Queensland Government Nature Conservation Act 1992.

References

splendida
Flora of Queensland
Plants described in 2002